Matjaž Pungertar (born 14 August 1990) is a Slovenian ski jumper. He competed in the 2015 World Cup season and represented Slovenia at the FIS Nordic World Ski Championships 2015 in Falun.

References

External links 
 

1990 births
Living people
Skiers from Ljubljana
Slovenian male ski jumpers
21st-century Slovenian people